Great Horton railway station was a railway station on the Queensbury-Bradford section of the Queensbury Lines which ran between Bradford, Keighley and Halifax via Queensbury. The station opened for passengers in 1878 and closed on 23 May 1955 but remained open to goods with full staff until 28 June 1965 before it was closed, then demolished and the branch line tracks ripped up.

Due to the relatively steep inclines, tunnels and a viaduct, the Queensbury Lines were also known as "the Alpine Route". More information about the geographical setting and history of the Queensbury to Bradford line is available at the Lost Railways West Yorkshire website.

The passenger station served the neighbourhoods of Great Horton and Lidget Green until service to and from Bradford town centre by more convenient and accessible electric trolley buses along the parallel roads of Legrams Lane and Great Horton Road lured passenger traffic away from the station.

Besides passenger and parcels service from the station platforms, adjacent sidings and trackwork also served a general purpose goods shed, a coal tipple (or coal drops), a casting foundry, a number of nearby weaving mills for textile manufacturing, and others. Three significant textile mills were located a short walk from the station, including Westcroft Mill, Beckside Worsted Mills, and Cannon Mills, currently re-purposed as a shopping village.

Freight operations during the 1950s included general goods and cargo as well as coal used as fuel by nearby households and industries. During the colder heating season a daily train delivered about a dozen wagons loaded with coal to the coal drops. The approach from Bradford was a rather steep incline and the steam engine would often struggle to find traction on the slippery rails, damp from the then-frequent morning fog. The engine would pull up beyond the Beckside Road bridge, then coast the wagons back down the slight incline to the coal drops on the south side of the station complex.

Various specialized types of sand of varying colours, textures and consistency were delivered to the casting foundry on the north side of the station complex, which had bunkers or drops to receive and store the sand needed for mould-making for casting large iron and steel parts.

Other freight operations entailed the receiving of general freight and cargo. A large number of empty barrels used for oils and chemicals, probably at the worsted weaving mills, ended up being stored in small mountains alongside the tracks on the northern side. Wagons being delivered or picked up from these sidings were shunted on an as-needed basis.

Operations were complex enough to warrant a dedicated signal box, which was located on the west-bound or Clayton platform side, across from the main station building. A metal overpass allowed passengers to cross over to or from the main station house to the opposite platform. In earlier days, access was also possible directly via metal stairs from the Beckside Road bridge to the station overpass below.

During the late 1950s, the line was used to train operators of DMUs (Diesel Multiple Unit) which made practice runs on the line to and from Bradford.

No sign remains of the former station, platforms, signal box, or tracks. The site has been re-purposed for modern-day industrial use.

Interest in this and other stations along the Queensbury Lines is maintained due to the support for continuing steam locomotive operations of the nearby Keighley and Worth Valley Railway historic preservation association.

The Queensbury Lines also have a lot of interest for railway fans and historians due to the variety of grades, cuttings, tunnels, and a long viaduct, all within a relatively short distance of each other.

References

External links
 Great Horton station on navigable 1947 O. S. map
 General view from Beckside Road Bridge, 1950s. Photo at http://steammemories.blogspot.com/
 View of main station house building. Photo at http://steammemories.blogspot.com/
 View of goods yard and signal box. Photo at http://steammemories.blogspot.com/
 View of dilapidated station, from the east.
 Photos/Images at Disused Stations; Station Name: Great Horton
 Aerial photos (most taken 1947) of adjacent mills and areas include aerial views of Great Horton Station
 Map of Great Horton (1890-1891) area includes Great Horton Station

Disused railway stations in Bradford
Former Great Northern Railway stations
Railway stations in Great Britain opened in 1878
Railway stations in Great Britain closed in 1955